Grace Gospel Fellowship is a Christian denomination in the United States associated with the Grace Movement. The denomination has its headquarters in Grand Rapids, Michigan.

History
The Church has roots in a conference of pastors in 1943, in Indianapolis. Grace Gospel Fellowship was founded in 1944. In 1992 it had an estimated 60,000 members in 128 churches. In 2021, Bryan Walker become the President of the Grace Gospel Fellowship and former executive director Matt Amundsen was named Vice President. As of 2020, 107 churches were listed in the Fellowship's church directory.

Beliefs
It is dispensational and premillennial in its theology, and holds to a congregational church polity.

References

External links
 

Christian organizations established in 1944
Organizations based in Grand Rapids, Michigan
Religion in Grand Rapids, Michigan